Hornflågene is a mountain in Nord-Fron Municipality in Innlandet county, Norway. The mountain is surrounded by several other notable mountains including Geitsida to the northeast, Veslsvulten to the north, and Rondvasshøgde, Simlepiggen, and Storronden to the northwest.

See also
List of mountains of Norway by height

References

Nord-Fron
Mountains of Innlandet